Exterminator! is a short story collection written by William S. Burroughs and first published in 1973. Early editions label the book a novel. It is not to be confused with The Exterminator, another collection of stories Burroughs published in 1960 in collaboration with Brion Gysin.

The collection contains a number of Burroughs' most popular short pieces, such as "Twilight's Last Gleamings", "The Discipline of DE", "Wind Die, You Die, We Die", "Ali's Smile", and "The Coming of the Purple Better One". The title story is about an insect exterminator, a job Burroughs himself once held. Some of the stories, such as "Ali's Smile", had previously been published in other books and magazines such as Rolling Stone, Village Voice, Evergreen Review, and Esquire. 

"Ali's Smile" was also later included in Ali's Smile/Naked Scientology. A different story entitled "Twilight's Last Gleamings" appears in the later collection, Interzone.

Adaptations and homages 
In the 1980s, actor Ed Asner recorded a spoken word adaptation of "Wind Die. You Die. We Die", while Burroughs and Kurt Cobain recorded a musical version of one of the stories as The "Priest" They Called Him. Certain aspects of the short story "Exterminator!" were used in the 1991 film version of Naked Lunch, with the main character William Lee (a Burroughs stand-in) holding the titular job at the film's beginning. 

Al Columbia's 1994 comic book series The Biologic Show takes its title from a phrase used in the story "Short Trip Home". The passage from which the phrase originates is quoted at greater length in an eponymous short story from the comic's first issue.

Story list
Exterminator! contains the following stories:

 "Exterminator!"
 The Lemon Kid
 Short Trip Home
 Davy Jones
 The Evening News
 Astronaut's Return
 My Face
 Wind Die. You Die. We Die.
 End of the Line
 The Drums of Death
 "Johnny 23"
 The Discipline of DE
 The Perfect Servant
 Ali's Smile
 Twilight's Last Gleamings
 The Coming of the Purple Better One
 "What Washington? What Orders?"
 From Here to Eternity
 The Teacher
 They Do Not Always Remember
 Friends
 Seeing Red
 Old Movie
 Electricals
 SPUT
 Reddies
 The "Priest" They Called Him
 My Legs Señor
 The End
 Cold Lost Marbles

1973 short story collections
Short story collections by William S. Burroughs
Viking Press books